Don't Be Tardy is an American reality television show that premiered on Bravo on April 26, 2012, as Don't Be Tardy for the Wedding. Developed as the first spin-off of The Real Housewives of Atlanta, featuring Kim Zolciak, her husband Kroy Biermann and the couple's children, with chef Tracey Bloom and nanny Berta.

In May 2021, it was announced that Don't Be Tardy had been canceled after eight seasons.

Background
Don't Be Tardy follows the daily lives of Kim Zolciak, her husband, Kroy Biermann, and their family. The first season was titled Don't Be Tardy for the Wedding, which documented the couple as they prepared for their wedding, as well as the wedding day itself. In November 2012, the series was renewed for a second season, with the series being renamed to its current title. Season 2 premiered on April 16, 2013. The second season encompasses Zolciak as she moves on from The Real Housewives of Atlanta, takes care of her family, constructs her dream home, and manages to live out of the townhouse with the couple's growing family.

Kroy met Kim Zolciak in May 2010 while Zolciak was attending the Dancing Stars of Atlanta charity event to support fellow Real Housewives cast member, Sheree Whitfield. Biermann and  Zolciak started dating and, just three months later, Zolciak was pregnant. On May 31, 2011, Zolciak gave birth to son Kroy Jagger Biermann Jr. This was Biermann's first child and Kim's first son. The couple wed at their previous Atlanta home on November 11, 2011. On March 20, 2012, Kim announced via Twitter that she and Kroy were expecting their second child together. On August 15, 2012, they welcomed their second son, Kash Kade Biermann. It was announced on June 5, 2013, that the couple was expecting their third child together. It was then announced on August 19, 2013, that the couple was expecting a set of twins; the twins are the couples' third and fourth children - Zolciak's fifth and sixth. Zolciak announced that she gave birth to her twins on November 25, 2013. The girl is named Kaia Rose after one of Kroy's nieces, Kiah, and "Psychic Rose" - who Kim is seen visiting throughout her time on The Real Housewives - while her boy, Kane Ren, includes Ren after Zolciak's OBGYN who has delivered 5 out of her 6 children.

Production
Bravo announced the third season renewal of Don't Be Tardy in April 2014. Season 3 premiered on July 17, 2014. The third season features Kim and Kroy's two new twins (a boy and a girl), their first two children together (both boys), and their two teenagers (adopted by Kroy but fathered in previous relationships of Kim's). The four younger children are all under the age of four. Kroy dealt with a football injury that temporarily suspended his football career. The family has moved into their completed 6,500 square-foot home.

In March 2015, Bravo renewed Don't Be Tardy for a fourth season, which premiered on August 16, 2015. In April 2016, the show was renewed for a fifth season, which premiered on September 14, 2016. In April 2017, the series was renewed for a sixth season, which premiered on October 6, 2017. In April 2018, the series was renewed for a seventh season which premiered on February 17, 2019.

In July 2019, the series was renewed for an eighth season. The season was due to premiere in July 2020, but was pushed to October 6, 2020. On May 7, 2021, Bravo cancelled the show after eight seasons.

Episodes

References

External links
 
 

2010s American reality television series
2020s American reality television series
2012 American television series debuts
2020 American television series endings
English-language television shows
Television shows set in Atlanta
Bravo (American TV network) original programming
American television spin-offs
Reality television spin-offs
The Real Housewives spin-offs
Wedding television shows